Kim Mi-gyeong (born 19 February 1967) is a South Korean long-distance runner. She competed in the women's marathon at the 1988 Summer Olympics.

References

1967 births
Living people
Athletes (track and field) at the 1988 Summer Olympics
South Korean female long-distance runners
South Korean female marathon runners
Olympic athletes of South Korea
Place of birth missing (living people)
20th-century South Korean women